Daniel Fabrizi (born February 22, 1992) is a Canadian soccer player who played as a defender.

Club career

College soccer 
Fabrizi played for York University for four years. In his final year in 2014, York won both the OUA and CIS championships, with Fabrizi earning OUA West first-team all-star honours.

CSL 
In 2010, he played in the Canadian Soccer League with TFC Academy. The following season he departed from Toronto FC's youth system in order to play with league rivals SC Toronto. In his debut season with Toronto, he assisted the club in securing the First Division title. Toronto would ultimately be eliminated in the first round of the playoffs by York Region Shooters.  

He returned to play with Toronto for the 2012 season. For the second consecutive season, he assisted Toronto in clinching a postseason berth by finishing third in the first division. Toronto's playoff journey was short-lived as they were eliminated from the competition in the first round by the Serbian White Eagles.  

After the conclusion of the 2012 season, he had a trial run with FC Edmonton of the North American Soccer League. In the winter of 2013, he was invited to train with Toronto FC during preseason camp. Fabrizi time in the preseason camp resulted in the defender playing in the 2013 Walt Disney World Pro Soccer Classic against Columbus Crew.

Vaughan Azzurri 
In 2014, he played with Vaughan Azzurri in League1 Ontario, being named to the League1 Next XI at the end of the season.

USL 
Fabrizi signed his first professional contract with Toronto FC II on March 20, 2015. He made his debut for the club against the Charleston Battery on March 21. Fabrizi was let go at the end of the 2015 season as his contract was not renewed. In total, he appeared in 18 matches.

References

External links
 York Lions profile

Living people
1992 births
Canadian soccer players
Association football defenders
Toronto FC players
York Lions soccer players
SC Toronto players
Toronto FC II players
USL Championship players
Canadian Soccer League (1998–present) players
Soccer people from Ontario
Soccer players from Brampton